The Electoral district of Pastoral Districts of Clarence and Darling Downs was an electorate of the New South Wales Legislative Council at a time when some of its members were elected and the balance were appointed by the Governor. It was a new electorate created in 1851 by the expansion of the Legislative Council to 54, 18 to be appointed and 36 elected. It included the Clarence Valley and the Darling Downs region, which became part of Queensland on its establishment in 1859.

In 1856 the unicameral Legislative Council was abolished and replaced with an elected Legislative Assembly and an appointed Legislative Council. The district was represented by the Legislative Assembly electorate of Clarence and Darling Downs.

Members

Election results

1851

1855
George Leslie resigned in February 1855.

See also
Members of the New South Wales Legislative Council, 1851-1856

References

Former electoral districts of New South Wales Legislative Council
Electoral districts of New South Wales in the area of Queensland
1851 establishments in Australia
1856 disestablishments in Australia